Nanoid robotics, or for short, nanorobotics or nanobotics, is an emerging technology field creating machines or robots whose components are at or near the scale of a nanometer (10−9 meters). More specifically, nanorobotics (as opposed to microrobotics) refers to the nanotechnology engineering discipline of designing and building nanorobots with devices ranging in size from 0.1 to 10 micrometres and constructed of nanoscale or molecular components. The terms nanobot, nanoid, nanite, nanomachine and nanomite have also been used to describe such devices currently under research and development.

Nanomachines are largely in the research and development phase, but some primitive molecular machines and nanomotors have been tested. An example is a sensor having a switch approximately 1.5 nanometers across, able to count specific molecules in the chemical sample. The first useful applications of nanomachines may be in nanomedicine.  For example, biological machines could be used to identify and destroy cancer cells. Another potential application is the detection of toxic chemicals, and the measurement of their concentrations, in the environment. Rice University has demonstrated a single-molecule car developed by a chemical process and including Buckminsterfullerenes (buckyballs) for wheels. It is actuated by controlling the environmental temperature and by positioning a scanning tunneling microscope tip.

Another definition is a robot that allows precise interactions with nanoscale objects, or can manipulate with nanoscale resolution. Such devices are more related to microscopy or scanning probe microscopy, instead of the description of nanorobots as molecular machines. Using the microscopy definition, even a large apparatus such as an atomic force microscope can be considered a nanorobotic instrument when configured to perform nanomanipulation. For this viewpoint, macroscale robots or microrobots that can move with nanoscale precision can also be considered nanorobots.

Nanorobotics theory

According to Richard Feynman, it was his former graduate student and collaborator Albert Hibbs who originally suggested to him (circa 1959) the idea of a medical use for Feynman's theoretical micro-machines (see biological machine). Hibbs suggested that certain repair machines might one day be reduced in size to the point that it would, in theory, be possible to (as Feynman put it) "swallow the surgeon". The idea was incorporated into Feynman's case study 1959 essay There's Plenty of Room at the Bottom.

Since nano-robots would be microscopic in size, it would probably be necessary for very large numbers of them to work together to perform microscopic and macroscopic tasks. These nano-robot swarms, both those unable to replicate (as in utility fog) and those able to replicate unconstrained in the natural environment (as in grey goo and synthetic biology), are found in many science fiction stories, such as the Borg nano-probes in Star Trek and The Outer Limits episode "The New Breed".
Some proponents of nano-robotics, in reaction to the grey goo scenarios that they earlier helped to propagate, hold the view that nano-robots able to replicate outside of a restricted factory environment do not form a necessary part of a purported productive nanotechnology, and that the process of self-replication, were it ever to be developed, could be made inherently safe. They further assert that their current plans for developing and using molecular manufacturing do not in fact include free-foraging replicators.

A detailed theoretical discussion of nanorobotics, including specific design issues such as sensing, power communication, navigation, manipulation, locomotion, and onboard computation, has been presented in the medical context of nanomedicine by Robert Freitas. Some of these discussions remain at the level of unbuildable generality and do not approach the level of detailed engineering.

Legal and ethical implications

Open technology
A document with a proposal on nanobiotech development using open design technology methods, as in open-source hardware and open-source software, has been addressed to the United Nations General Assembly. According to the document sent to the United Nations, in the same way that open source has in recent years accelerated the development of computer systems, a similar approach should benefit the society at large and accelerate nanorobotics development. The use of nanobiotechnology should be established as a human heritage for the coming generations, and developed as an open technology based on ethical practices for peaceful purposes. Open technology is stated as a fundamental key for such an aim.

Nanorobot race
In the same ways that technology research and development drove the space race and nuclear arms race, a race for nanorobots is occurring. There is plenty of ground allowing nanorobots to be included among the emerging technologies. Some of the reasons are that large corporations, such as General Electric, Hewlett-Packard, Synopsys, Northrop Grumman and Siemens have been recently working in the development and research of nanorobots; surgeons are getting involved and starting to propose ways to apply nanorobots for common medical procedures; universities and research institutes were granted funds by government agencies exceeding $2 billion towards research developing nanodevices for medicine; bankers are also strategically investing with the intent to acquire beforehand rights and royalties on future nanorobots commercialisation. Some aspects of nanorobot litigation and related issues linked to monopoly have already arisen. A large number of patents has been granted recently on nanorobots, done mostly for patent agents, companies specialized solely on building patent portfolios, and lawyers. After a long series of patents and eventually litigations, see for example the invention of radio, or the war of currents, emerging fields of technology tend to become a monopoly, which normally is dominated by large corporations.

Manufacturing approaches

Manufacturing nanomachines assembled from molecular components is a very challenging task. Because of the level of difficulty, many engineers and scientists continue working cooperatively across multidisciplinary approaches to achieve breakthroughs in this new area of development. Thus, it is quite understandable the importance of the following distinct techniques currently applied towards manufacturing nanorobots:

Biochip

The joint use of nanoelectronics, photolithography, and new biomaterials provides a possible approach to manufacturing nanorobots for common medical uses, such as surgical instrumentation, diagnosis, and drug delivery. This method for manufacturing on nanotechnology scale is in use in the electronics industry since 2008. So, practical nanorobots should be integrated as nanoelectronics devices, which will allow tele-operation and advanced capabilities for medical instrumentation.

Nubots

A nucleic acid robot (nubot) is an organic molecular machine at the nanoscale. DNA structure can provide means to assemble 2D and 3D nanomechanical devices. DNA based machines can be activated using small molecules, proteins and other molecules of DNA. Biological circuit gates based on DNA materials have been engineered as molecular machines to allow in-vitro drug delivery for targeted health problems. Such material based systems would work most closely to smart biomaterial drug system delivery, while not allowing precise in vivo teleoperation of such engineered prototypes.

Surface-bound systems
Several reports have demonstrated the attachment of synthetic molecular motors to surfaces. These primitive nanomachines have been shown to undergo machine-like motions when confined to the surface of a macroscopic material.  The surface anchored motors could potentially be used to move and position nanoscale materials on a surface in the manner of a conveyor belt.

Positional nanoassembly
Nanofactory Collaboration, founded by Robert Freitas and Ralph Merkle in 2000 and involving 23 researchers from 10 organizations and 4 countries, focuses on developing a practical research agenda specifically aimed at developing positionally-controlled diamond mechanosynthesis and a diamondoid nanofactory that would have the capability of building diamondoid medical nanorobots.

Biohybrids

The emerging field of bio-hybrid systems combines biological and synthetic structural elements for biomedical or robotic applications. The constituting elements of bio-nanoelectromechanical systems (BioNEMS) are of nanoscale size, for example DNA, proteins or nanostructured mechanical parts. Thiol-ene e-beams resist allow the direct writing of nanoscale features, followed by the functionalization of the natively reactive resist surface with biomolecules. Other approaches use a biodegradable material attached to magnetic particles that allow them to be guided around the body.

Bacteria-based

This approach proposes the use of biological microorganisms, like the bacterium Escherichia coli and Salmonella typhimurium.
Thus the model uses a flagellum for propulsion purposes. Electromagnetic fields normally control the motion of this kind of biological integrated device.
Chemists at the University of Nebraska have created a humidity gauge by fusing a bacterium to a silicon computer chip.

Virus-based
Retroviruses can be retrained to attach to cells and replace DNA. They go through a process called reverse transcription to deliver genetic packaging in a vector. Usually, these devices are Pol – Gag genes of the virus for the Capsid and Delivery system. This process is called retroviral gene therapy, having the ability to re-engineer cellular DNA by usage of viral vectors. This approach has appeared in the form of retroviral, adenoviral, and lentiviral gene delivery systems. These gene therapy vectors have been used in cats to send genes into the genetically modified organism (GMO), causing it to display the trait.

3D printing

3D printing is the process by which a three-dimensional structure is built through the various processes of additive manufacturing. Nanoscale 3D printing involves many of the same process, incorporated at a much smaller scale. To print a structure in the 5-400 µm scale, the precision of the 3D printing machine needs to be improved greatly. A two-step process of 3D printing, using a 3D printing and laser etched plates method was incorporated as an improvement technique. To be more precise at a nanoscale, the 3D printing process uses a laser etching machine, which etches the details needed for the segments of nanorobots into each plate. The plate is then transferred to the 3D printer, which fills the etched regions with the desired nanoparticle. The 3D printing process is repeated until the nanorobot is built from the bottom up. 

This 3D printing process has many benefits. First, it increases the overall accuracy of the printing process. Second, it has the potential to create functional segments of a nanorobot. The 3D printer uses a liquid resin, which is hardened at precisely the correct spots by a focused laser beam. The focal point of the laser beam is guided through the resin by movable mirrors and leaves behind a hardened line of solid polymer, just a few hundred nanometers wide. This fine resolution enables the creation of intricately structured sculptures as tiny as a grain of sand. This process takes place by using photoactive resins, which are hardened by the laser at an extremely small scale to create the structure. This process is quick by nanoscale 3D printing standards. Ultra-small features can be made with the 3D micro-fabrication technique used in multiphoton photopolymerisation. This approach uses a focused laser to trace the desired 3D object into a block of gel. Due to the nonlinear nature of photo excitation, the gel is cured to a solid only in the places where the laser was focused while the remaining gel is then washed away. Feature sizes of under 100 nm are easily produced, as well as complex structures with moving and interlocked parts.

Challenges in designing nanorobots 
There are number of challenges and problems that should be addressed when designing and building nanoscale machines with movable parts. The most obvious one is the need of developing very fine tools and manipulation techniques capable of assembling individual nanostructures with high precision into operational device. Less evident challenge is related to peculiarities of adhesion and friction on nanoscale. It is impossible to take existing design of macroscopic device with movable parts and just reduce it to the nanoscale. Such approach will not work due to high surface energy of nanostructures, which means that all contacting parts will stick together following the energy minimization principle. The adhesion and static friction between parts can easily exceed the strength of materials, so the parts will break before they start to move relative to each other. This leads to the need to design movable structures with minimal contact area []. 

In spite of the fast development of nanorobots, most of the nanorobots designed for drug delivery purposes, there is "still a long way to go before their commercialization and clinical applications can be achieved."

Potential uses

Nanomedicine

Potential uses for nanorobotics in medicine include early diagnosis and targeted drug-delivery for cancer, biomedical instrumentation, surgery, pharmacokinetics, monitoring of diabetes, and health care.

In such plans, future medical nanotechnology is expected to employ nanorobots injected into the patient to perform work at a cellular level. Such nanorobots intended for use in medicine should be non-replicating, as replication would needlessly increase device complexity, reduce reliability, and interfere with the medical mission.

Nanotechnology provides a wide range of new technologies for developing customized means to optimize the delivery of pharmaceutical drugs. Today, harmful side effects of treatments such as chemotherapy are commonly a result of drug delivery methods that don't pinpoint their intended target cells accurately. Researchers at Harvard and MIT, however, have been able to attach special RNA strands, measuring nearly 10 nm in diameter, to nanoparticles, filling them with a chemotherapy drug. These RNA strands are attracted to cancer cells. When the nanoparticle encounters a cancer cell, it adheres to it, and releases the drug into the cancer cell. This directed method of drug delivery has great potential for treating cancer patients while avoiding negative effects (commonly associated with improper drug delivery). The first demonstration of nanomotors operating in living organisms was carried out in 2014 at University of California, San Diego. MRI-guided nanocapsules are one potential precursor to nanorobots.

Another useful application of nanorobots is assisting in the repair of tissue cells alongside white blood cells. Recruiting inflammatory cells or white blood cells (which include neutrophil granulocytes, lymphocytes, monocytes, and mast cells) to the affected area is the first response of tissues to injury. Because of their small size, nanorobots could attach themselves to the surface of recruited white cells, to squeeze their way out through the walls of blood vessels and arrive at the injury site, where they can assist in the tissue repair process. Certain substances could possibly be used to accelerate the recovery.

The science behind this mechanism is quite complex. Passage of cells across the blood endothelium, a process known as transmigration, is a mechanism involving engagement of cell surface receptors to adhesion molecules, active force exertion and dilation of the vessel walls and physical deformation of the migrating cells. By attaching themselves to migrating inflammatory cells, the robots can in effect "hitch a ride" across the blood vessels, bypassing the need for a complex transmigration mechanism of their own.

, in the United States, Food and Drug Administration (FDA) regulates nanotechnology on the basis of size.

Nanocomposite particles that are controlled remotely by an electromagnetic field was also developed. This series of nanorobots that are now enlisted in the Guinness World Records, can be used to interact with the biological cells. Scientists suggest that this technology can be used for the treatment of cancer.

Cultural references

The Nanites are characters on the TV show Mystery Science Theater 3000. They're self-replicating, bio-engineered organisms that work on the ship and reside in the SOL's computer systems. They made their first appearance in Season 8.
Nanites are used in a number of episodes in the Netflix series "Travelers". They be programmed and injected into injured people to perform repairs. First appearance in season 1

Nanites also feature in the Rise of Iron 2016 expansion for Destiny in which SIVA, a self-replicating nanotechnology is used as a weapon.

Nanites (referred to more often as Nanomachines) are often referenced in Konami's "Metal Gear" series being used to enhance and regulate abilities and body functions.

In the Star Trek franchise TV shows nanites play an important plot device. Starting with "Evolution" in the third season of The Next Generation, Borg Nanoprobes perform the function of maintaining the Borg cybernetic systems, as well as repairing damage to the organic parts of a Borg. They generate new technology inside a Borg when needed, as well as protecting them from many forms of disease.

Nanites play a role in the video game Deus Ex, being the basis of the nano-augmentation technology which gives augmented people superhuman abilities.

Nanites are also mentioned in the Arc of a Scythe book series by Neal Shusterman and are used to heal all nonfatal injuries, regulate bodily functions, and considerably lessen pain.

Nanites are also an integral part of the Stargate SG1 and Stargate Atlantis, where grey goo scenarios are portrayed.

See also
 Microswimmer
 Molecular machine
 Nanoelectromechanical systems
 Nanomotors

References

Further reading

External links

A Review in Nanorobotics – US Department of Energy

Nanotechnology
Robotics
Emerging technologies
Nanomachines